RMB is the name of a German electronic music duo, founded in 1993 by musicians and producers Farid Gharadjedaghi and Rolf Maier-Bode (the latter whose initials form the band name).

History 
The two met in 1991 while working for the Adam & Eve label, Maier-Bode as a producer and Gharadjedaghi as A&R. After two releases under the RMB name, they split from Adam & Eve in 1993 to join the Low Spirit label. Their 1996 single, "Spring" was a gold record in Germany, with sales over 250,000 copies, and the follow-up "Reality" reached #11 in the Media Control charts. After this, they worked with Sharam Jey and Talla 2XLC. In 1998, they founded their own label, Various Silver Recordings.

Through their association with German rave culture, they have engaged in environmental activism, joining Greenpeace in protest against the Moruroa atol nuclear testing, to which they dedicated the track "Our Trip to Mururoa", a B-side found in the single "Passport to Heaven".

In 2006 RMB split up. The last studio album "Evolution" has been released online March 18, 2009.

Members 
 Rolf Maier-Bode - production, keyboard, programming
 Farid Gharadjedaghi - production, keyboards, engineering, mixing

Discography

Albums 
1995 This World Is Yours
1998 Widescreen
2001 Mission Horizon
2002 Mission Horizon 2.0
2003 A Tribute To RMB
2009 Evolution

Singles 
1993 "Trax 1"
1993 "Trax 2"
1993 "Heaven & Hell EP"
1994 "Love EP"
1994 "Redemption" (with Kristina Totzek)
1994 "Redemption (Remixes)" (with Kristina Totzek)
1995 "Experience" (with Kristina Totzek)
1995 "Experience (Remixes)" (with Kristina Totzek)
1995 "Love Is An Ocean" (with Sheila Chandra)
1995 "Love Is An Ocean (Remixes)" (with Sheila Chandra)
1995 "Passport to Heaven" (with Kristina Totzek)
1995 "Passport to Heaven (Remixes)" (with Kristina Totzek)
1996 "Spring" (with Marion Haarmeyer)
1996 "Spring (Mixes)" (with Marion Haarmeyer)
1996 "Reality" (with Angela Caran)
1996 "Reality (Mixes)" (with Angela Caran)
1997 "Break The Silence/Everything" (with Angela Caran)
1998 "Shadows" (with Sharam Jey and Christina Lux)
1998 "Everything EP"
1998 "To France"
2000 "Deep Down Below" (with Christina Lux)
2001 "Horizon" (with Christina Lux)
2001 "Selected Works"
2002 "Redemption 2.0" (with Kristina Totzek)
2003 "Spring 2003" (with Talla 2XLC and Miriam Adameit)
2003 "Touch The Sky/Feel The Flame"
2004 "Gangster/Killer"
2004 "April/Beauty Of Simplicity"

Other aliases 
1992 "Droid EP", as Skyflyer (with Arndt Pecher)
1992 "Humanoid EP", as Skyflyer (with Arndt Pecher)
1993 "Skyflyer II", as Skyflyer (with Arndt Pecher)
1993 "Skyflyer III", as Skyflyer (with Arndt Pecher)
1993 "Manitou in Africa", as Manitou
1996 "Manitou in Africa 1996 (The 4 Years Later Version)", as Manitou
1998 "One EP", as Waldorf & Staettler
2004 "Special Online EP", as Waldorf & Staettler

References

External links 
 RMB - Music Label "Various"
 
 Danceartistinfo Discography

German electronic music groups
German techno music groups
Hardcore techno music groups